Camdale is a locality and small rural community in the local government area of Burnie, in the North West region of Tasmania. The Cam River forms its western boundary, Bass Strait the northern boundary, and the Bass Highway follows the northern boundary. The 2016 census determined a population of 72 for the state suburb of Camdale.

History
The locality of Somerset, to the west of the Cam River, was originally known as Port Maldon. An 1858 map shows Port Maldon to the east of the river, on part of the current locality of Camdale. In 1960 the then Municipality of Burnie proposed the name “Maldon” for the locality.

Road infrastructure
The C109 route (East Cam Road) terminates at the Bass Highway in Camdale.

Native wildlife
The coast of Bass Strait at Camdale is a location where little penguins come ashore. Local volunteers build and maintain fences to prevent them from attempting to cross the Bass Highway, where some have been killed.

Sporting facilities
The Burnie Golf Club, whose course occupies land in East Cam to the south, is accessed from Camdale.

References

Suburbs of Burnie, Tasmania
Towns in Tasmania